The 2002 France rugby union tour of Argentina and Australia was a series of matches of the France national team during their tour to Argentina and Australia in 2002. It was the 12th visit of a French side to Argentina and the 8th to Australia.

It was one of the less successful France tours: out of five matches played, including three full tests, the team lost all of them.

Match summary

Match details

References

Rugby union tours of Argentina
Rugby union tours of Australia
France national rugby union team tours
History of rugby union matches between Australia and France
France rugby union tour of Argentina and Australia
France rugby union tour of Argentina and Australia
France rugby union tour of Argentina and Australia
France rugby union tour of Argentina and Australia
France rugby union tour of Argentina and Australia